Allan Richard Quartermain (10 December 1913 – 13 July 1985) was an Australian rules footballer who played for the Hawthorn Football Club in the Victorian Football League (VFL).

He was the younger brother of Fitzroy player Don Quartermain.

Notes

External links 

1913 births
1985 deaths
Australian rules footballers from Victoria (Australia)
Hawthorn Football Club players
Frankston Football Club players